Chester Simmons III (born July 24, 1982), better known as Tre Simmons, is an American former professional basketball player. He played college basketball for Odessa, Green River CC and Washington before playing professionally in Greece, Spain, Israel, Czech Republic, Russia, Puerto Rico and France. Simmons was named EuroChallenge Final Four MVP in 2013.

College career
Simmons played college basketball at Odessa College, Green River Community College and the University of Washington. He was named to the 2004-05 season's All-Pac-10 First Team.

Professional career
Simmons began his professional career in 2006 when he joined the Greek League club PAOK. He then moved to the Spanish League and ULEB Cup club Gran Canaria for the 2006-07 season, but in the middle of the season moved to Israel and signed for the Superleague club Hapoel Galil Elyon. The following season he moved to Hapoel Holon with whom he won the league championship.

He joined the Euroleague club Maccabi Tel Aviv for the 2008-09 season. For the 2009-10 season he signed with Hapoel Jerusalem. From 2010 to 2012 he played for ČEZ Nymburk in Czech Republic where he won Czech National Championship and the Czech National Cup. In June 2012 he signed with Krasnye Krylya Samara of Russia for the 2012-13 season. In July 2013, he returned to ČEZ Nymburk. On May 29, 2015, he signed with Cangrejeros de Santurce of Puerto Rico for the 2015 BSN season.

On November 29, 2015, he signed with Hapoel Tel Aviv.

On August 26, 2016, he signed with French club Antibes Sharks.

On December 18, 2017, he returned to Israel for a third stint, signing with Hapoel Afula of the Liga Leumit for the rest of the season. One day later, he made his debut in a 94–92 win over Maccabi Hod HaSharon, recording 22 points, four assists and four rebounds.

On November 8, 2018, he announced his retirement from playing professional basketball.

References

External links
 Euroleague.net profile
 Eurobasket.com profile
 FIBA.com profile

1982 births
Living people
ABA League players
African-American basketball players
American expatriate basketball people in France
American expatriate basketball people in Greece
American expatriate basketball people in Israel
American expatriate basketball people in Russia
American expatriate basketball people in Spain
American expatriate basketball people in the Czech Republic
American men's basketball players
Basketball players from Seattle
BC Krasnye Krylia players
Big3 players
Cangrejeros de Santurce basketball players
CB Gran Canaria players
Basketball Nymburk players
Garfield High School (Seattle) alumni
Green River Gators men's basketball players
Hapoel Afula players
Hapoel Galil Elyon players
Hapoel Holon players
Hapoel Jerusalem B.C. players
Hapoel Tel Aviv B.C. players
Israeli Basketball Premier League players
Liga ACB players
Maccabi Tel Aviv B.C. players
Odessa Wranglers men's basketball players
Olympique Antibes basketball players
P.A.O.K. BC players
Shooting guards
Small forwards
Washington Huskies men's basketball players
21st-century African-American sportspeople
20th-century African-American people
American men's 3x3 basketball players